The 2018 Israeli Basketball Premier League Final Four, for sponsorship reasons the Winner League Final Four, the concluding tournament of the 2017–18 Israeli Basketball Premier League. It was the eight Israeli Final Four. The event was held in the Menora Mivtachim Arena, Tel Aviv from June 10 until June 14, 2018.

Maccabi Tel Aviv won the title for the 52nd time after beating Hapoel Holon 95–75 in the Final. Alex Tyus was named the Final Four MVP.

Results

Bracket

Semifinals

Final

Winning roster

}

References

Specific

General
IBA's official website (Hebrew)

2018 Final Four